This is a list of episodes of Clifford the Big Red Dog.

Series overview

{| class="wikitable"
|-
! style="padding:0 8px;" rowspan="2" colspan="2"| Season
! style="padding:0 8px;" rowspan="2"| Episodes
! style="padding:0 80px;" colspan="2"| Originally aired 
|-
! First aired
! Last aired
|-
| style="background:#3251AE; color:#100; text-align:center;"|
| style="text-align:center;"| [[List of Clifford the Big Red Dog episodes#Season 1 (2000–2001)|1]]
| style="text-align:center;"| 40
| style="text-align:center;"| 
| style="text-align:center;"| 
|-
| style="background:#87CEEB; color:#100; text-align:center;"|
| style="text-align:center;"| [[List of Clifford the Big Red Dog episodes#Season 2 (2002–2003)|2]]
| style="text-align:center;"| 26
| style="text-align:center;"| 
| style="text-align:center;"| 
|}

Episodes

Season 1 (2000–2001)

Season 2 (2002–2003)

References

Lists of American children's animated television series episodes
Lists of British children's television series episodes
Lists of British animated television series episodes
Clifford the Big Red Dog